Elbe (A511) is the lead ship of the s of the German Navy.

Development 

The Elbe-class replenishment ships are also known tenders of the German Navy. In German, this type of ship is called Versorgungsschiffe which can be translated as "supply ship" though the official translation in English is "replenishment ship". 

They are intended to support German naval units away from their home ports. The ships carry fuel, provisions, ammunition and other matériel and also provide medical services. The ships are named after German rivers where German parliaments were placed.

Construction and career 
Elbe was launched in June 1992 in Bremen-Vegesack, Germany. She was commissioned on 28 January 1993.

Elbe had moved from its home base in Rostock-Warnemünde to Kiel on 14 July 2016 to join forces with the Sakala from Estonia and  Skalvis from Lithuania. On 18 July, the ships then set sail together for the Baltic Sea to later join the standing NATO mine countermeasures group SNMCMG 1 (Standing NATO Mine Countermeasures Group 1). The tender Elbe is now the operations center for the international task force.

Gallery

References

External links 

Elbe-class replenishment ships
1992 ships
Ships built in Bremen (state)